Kiliki may be,

 a statue used in the Festival of San Fermín#Giants and big-heads parade
 Kiliki language, a fictional language created for the 2015 Indian film Baahubali: The Beginning